Freestyle Motocross: McGrath vs Pastrana is a racing video game developed by Z-Axis, Ltd. and published by Acclaim Entertainment for PlayStation in 2000.

Reception

The game received "generally unfavorable reviews" according to the review aggregation website Metacritic.

Notes

References

External links
 

2000 video games
Acclaim Entertainment games
Motorcycle video games
Off-road racing video games
PlayStation (console) games
PlayStation (console)-only games
Video games based on real people
Video games developed in the United States